The 1852 United States presidential election in Tennessee took place on November 2, 1852, as part of the 1852 United States presidential election. Voters chose twelve representatives, or electors to the Electoral College, who voted for President and Vice President.

Tennessee voted for the Whig candidate, Winfield Scott, over Democratic candidate Franklin Pierce.

Tennessee was one of the four states to vote for Scott in the 1852 election with the other three being Kentucky, Massachusetts and Vermont.

Despite Scott winning the state by a narrow margin of 1.46%, Tennessee would prove to be Scott's second strongest state in the nation after Kentucky.

Results

References

Tennessee
1852
1852 Tennessee elections